The Sovereign 28 is an American sailboat that was designed as a cruiser and first built in 1983.

The design was developed into the Sovereign 30 in 1998.

Production
The design was built by Sovereign Yachts in the United States, starting in 1983, but it is now out of production.

Design
The Sovereign 28 is a recreational keelboat, built predominantly of fiberglass, with wood trim. It has a cutter rig with a bowsprit, a center cockpit, a clipper bow, an angled transom, an internally mounted spade-type rudder controlled by a wheel and a fixed fin keel. It displaces  and carries  of ballast.

The boat is fitted with a German BMW diesel engine for docking and maneuvering.

The design has sleeping accommodation for four people, with a double "V"-berth in the bow cabin and an aft cabin with a double berth. The galley is located on the port side just aft of the bow cabin. The galley is equipped with a two-burner stove, icebox and a sink. The head is located on the starboard side of the companionway and includes a shower.

See also
List of sailing boat types

References

Keelboats
1980s sailboat type designs
Sailing yachts 
Sailboat type designs by Sovereign Design Group
Sailboat types built by Sovereign Yachts